The Roman Catholic Church of Nové Zámky dominates the main square of the town,  which is in  south-west Slovakia.

A church at the site was built originally in 1584–1585. This was a simple late-Gothic building, and was later rebuilt several times.  The building with all its facilities was totally destroyed by a fire. Only the sacristy remained, and an "eternal light" from the presbytery was saved. Until 1867, the church was decorated in a typical building in the late-Baroque classic style. The most recent major reconstruction work was undertaken in 1877, giving the church a neoclassic character. The round shape of the windows probably dates from this  era.

Roman Catholic churches completed in 1877
19th-century Roman Catholic church buildings in Slovakia
Churches in Nitra Region
1877 establishments in Austria-Hungary